is a dam in Kitakami, Iwate Prefecture, Japan, completed in 1953.

References 

Dams in Iwate Prefecture
Dams completed in 1953